Leonardo Matías Garrido (born 2 February 1986) is an Argentine professional footballer who plays as an attacking midfielder for Sportivo Desamparados.

Career
Garrido began his career with Peñarol. He joined Trinidad in 2005, who he featured twenty times for during the 2005–06 Torneo Argentino B; scoring three goals in the process. In 2008, Garrido was signed by Torneo Argentino A team Sportivo Desamparados. Seven goals in ninety-six appearances followed in three seasons, with the last yielding promotion to Primera B Nacional. He subsequently made two appearances in tier two, prior to departing Sportivo Desamparados in 2011 to play for Primera B Nacional's Gimnasia y Esgrima. He played a total of thirty matches for the club between 2011 and 2013.

On 2 July 2013, Garrido joined Juventud Unida Universitario of Torneo Argentino A. He scored in his third match for them, in a win over CAI on 1 September. That was one of seven goals in 2013–14 for Garrido. He left Juventud Unida Universitario in mid-2014, joining Torneo Federal A side Deportivo Madryn for the rest of the year. He went on to score seven goals in thirteen games as Deportivo Madryn finished ninth. 2015 saw Garrido join Patronato in Primera B Nacional. He scored ten goals in forty-three appearances in a debut season that ended with promotion to the Argentine Primera División.

Garrido completed a move to Primera B Nacional club Sarmiento on 11 January 2019. Garrido headed abroad for the first time in the succeeding June, agreeing a contract with Honduran outfit Olimpia. He netted on his unofficial bow, scoring in a Copa Premier Centroamericana match with Costa Rica's Herediano on 11 July; a goal in the same competition over Árabe Unido of Panama followed. On 28 July, Garrido scored on his Liga Nacional debut versus Honduras Progreso, before continuing his scoring streak with a strike against Real Sociedad in his second appearance.

Career statistics
.

Honours

Club
Olimpia
Liga Nacional: 2019–20 Apertura

References

External links

1986 births
Living people
People from San Juan, Argentina
Argentine footballers
Association football midfielders
Argentine expatriate footballers
Expatriate footballers in Honduras
Argentine expatriate sportspeople in Honduras
Torneo Argentino B players
Torneo Argentino A players
Primera Nacional players
Torneo Federal A players
Argentine Primera División players
Liga Nacional de Fútbol Profesional de Honduras players
Trinidad de San Juan players
Sportivo Desamparados footballers
Gimnasia y Esgrima de Jujuy footballers
Juventud Unida Universitario players
Deportivo Madryn players
Club Atlético Patronato footballers
Club Atlético Sarmiento footballers
C.D. Olimpia players
Sportspeople from San Juan Province, Argentina